Canoeing at the 2014 Summer Youth Olympics was held between August 23 to August 27. The events took place at the Nanjing Rowing-Canoeing School in Nanjing, China.

Qualification
There were four events in sprint and slalom each (K1 and C1 for both genders). All athletes qualifying for an event must have competed in the same event in the other discipline (slalom or sprint) or risk disqualification. There were two events: the 2013 Junior Sprint World Championships in Welland, Ontario and the 2013 Junior slalom championship in Liptovsky Mikulas, Slovakia were quotas were awarded. Every continent must have been represented in each event. A total of 64 athletes competed, including 10 spots reserved for universality (5 per gender) and 2 for the hosts.

Summary

C-1

K-1

Schedule

The schedule was released by the Nanjing Youth Olympic Games Organizing Committee.

All times are CST (UTC+8)

Medal summary

Boys' Events

Girls' Events

Medal table

References

External links
Official Results Book – Canoeing

 
2014 Summer Youth Olympics events
Youth Summer Olympics
2014
Canoeing in China